Snuggle Truck is a driving/racing action game developed by Owlchemy Labs. Originally, the game was titled Smuggle Truck, and it involved smuggling immigrants across the United States border, but it was rejected by Apple's App Store due to its controversial subject matter, so the characters were swapped out for stuffed animals, with the game revolving around getting them into a zoo, and the game was retitled Snuggle Truck in 2011. Since then, approximately 2 million copies have been downloaded for iOS, with 1.3 million downloads during the 9 days after going free-to-play. On March 26, 2012, both Snuggle Truck and Smuggle Truck were included in the Humble Bundle for Android 2, though the latter is only available on Android. Later on February 3 it was added to Steam.

References

2011 video games
Android (operating system) games
BlackBerry PlayBook games
IOS games
Linux games
MacOS games
Mobile games
Owlchemy Labs games
Racing video games
Single-player video games
Video games developed in the United States
Windows games